Aleppo Township is a township in Allegheny County, Pennsylvania, United States. The population was 1,828 at the 2020 census, a decrease from the figure of 1,916 tabulated in 2010.

Geography

Surrounding neighborhoods
Aleppo Township has six borders, including the borough of Sewickley Heights to the north, Kilbuck Township to the east, and the boroughs of Glenfield to the south, Haysville to the south-southwest, Glen Osborne to the southwest, and Sewickley to the west and northwest.

Government and Politics

Councilmembers
 [2017-2019] Republicans-2 (Doebler, Williams), Democrats-0, Unknown-3 (Jones, Darragh, Duplaga)

Education
Aleppo Township is served by the Quaker Valley School District.

History
Aleppo Township was incorporated as a township on June 7, 1876, from the western section of Kilbuck Township. It was part of the Depreciation Lands reserved for Revolutionary War veterans. Sparse settlement occurred in the 1800s, and Aleppo Township lost land that formed the boroughs of Sewickley Heights, Glenfield, and Haysville.

Aleppo became a first class township on November 8, 1960.

Demographics

As of the census of 2000, there were 1,039 people, 483 households, and 298 families residing in the township.  The population density was 573.5 people per square mile (221.6/km2).  There were 509 housing units at an average density of 281.0/sq mi (108.6/km2).  Roughly 62% (316 housing units) of the township's housing units are contained within a single homeowner's association: the Sewickley Heights Manor Homes Association.

The racial makeup of the township was 95.48% White, 3.08% African American, 1.06% Asian, 0.10% from other races, and 0.29% from two or more races. Hispanic or Latino of any race were 0.96% of the population.

There were 483 households, out of which 22.6% had children under the age of 18 living with them, 50.1% were married couples living together, 9.3% had a female householder with no husband present, and 38.3% were non-families. 34.4% of all households were made up of individuals, and 12.2% had someone living alone who was 65 years of age or older.  The average household size was 2.15 and the average family size was 2.78.

In the township the population was spread out, with 19.1% under the age of 18, 3.9% from 18 to 24, 26.3% from 25 to 44, 30.0% from 45 to 64, and 20.7% who were 65 years of age or older.  The median age was 46 years. For every 100 females there were 90.6 males.  For every 100 females age 18 and over, there were 85.7 males.

The median income for a household in the township was $59,167, and the median income for a family was $66,667. Males had a median income of $45,192 versus $40,000 for females. The per capita income for the township was $37,187.  About 3.8% of families and 5.0% of the population were below the poverty line, including 11.5% of those under age 18 and 2.0% of those age 65 or over.

References

Townships in Allegheny County, Pennsylvania